Angus MacKinnon (1851 – 24 July 1880) was a Scottish footballer who played for Queen's Park and represented Scotland. Born in Glasgow (but not related to his teammate Billy), he played once for Scotland, scoring the winning goal in a 2–1 victory against England in March 1874. After winning two Scottish Cups at club level, he emigrated to Canada but died there aged 29.

References

Scottish footballers
Queen's Park F.C. players
Scotland international footballers
Footballers from Glasgow
Date of birth missing
1851 births
1880 deaths
Scottish emigrants to Canada
Association football forwards